Kara Su Bridge also known as Zaqan is a bridge in Ardabil, north-west Iran. It bridges the Baliqly Chay River. The bridge has seven arches and was originally built as far back as the Safavid dynasty. The bridge was last renovated in about 1920.

References

Buildings and structures in Ardabil
Bridges in Iran